Sidi Aïch District is a district of Béjaïa Province, Algeria.

Municipalities
The district is further divided into 5 municipalities:
Sidi Aïch
El-Flaye
Tinabdher
Tifra
Sidi-Ayad

References

Districts of Béjaïa Province